The 1994 Sandown ATCC round was the second round of the 1994 Australian Touring Car Championship. It was held on the weekend of 4 to 6 March at Sandown Raceway in Melbourne, Victoria.

Race results

Qualifying 
Tomas Mezera carried through his pace demonstrated at Amaroo Park with a time of 1:13.568, to take his first pole position of the year. This was almost a second faster than his closest competitor, Mark Skaife

Peter Jackson Dash 
Mark Skaife would not make the start after his engine failed to start, leaving it a five-car race. John Bowe got off to a flyer and would keep the lead all the way to the flag.

Race 1 
Mezera got off to an early lead as Skaife made the most of the start - going from sixth to second by the end of the first corner. Both Dick Johnson and John Bowe ran into tyre problems early in the race, which would ultimately prove costly for the second race. On lap four, Skaife made a successful move on Mezera for the lead, however Skaife would not walk away with the lead as he did in Amaroo. For lap after lap, Mezera pressured Skaife. On the final corner on the final lap, Mezera made a move down the inside of Skaife to reclaim the lead. However, on the switchback, Skaife reclaimed the lead coming out of the corner to take the flag and win the first heat. Mezera finished in second and Alan Jones third.

Race 2 
Skaife would make the most of the front row start and got off to an early lead, whilst Larry Perkins climbed up five positions to second. Meanwhile, back down the back, chaos ensued. Neil Crompton and Glenn Seton came into contact at turn two, which sent both competitors to the back of the field. Mezera came charging through the pack, eventually passing Perkins for second position and gaining on leader, Skaife. However, he would spin on the second-to-last corner, losing a number of positions. Skaife would go on to win the race, making it four wins in a row for the Gibson Motorsport driver, ahead of Perkins and Jim Richards.

Championship Standings 

Drivers' Championship standings

References

External links 

Sandown Raceway